The following is a list of people who have studied at the San Beda University by campus.

San Beda University Manila

Presidents and historical figures
Agapito "Butz" Aquino (GS, HS) - key personality during the 1986 EDSA People Power Revolution; former Philippine senator and House Minority Floor Leader
Benigno Aquino Jr. (HS) - former Senator and key personality of the anti-Marcos regime struggle
Rodrigo Duterte (LI.B) - 16th President of the Republic of the Philippines; former Mayor of Davao City
Francisco A. Medrano (GS, HS) - World War II resistance fighter; former military general
Ramon V. Mitra (HS, Ll.B ) - 1992 Philippine presidential candidate; former Speaker of the House of Representatives; former senator and agriculture minister; human rights lawyer
Leni Robredo (Ll.M.) - 14th Vice President of the Republic of the Philippines
Raul Roco (AB, Ll.B) - 2004 Philippine presidential candidate; former senator and education secretary; champion of women's rights and icon of the youth
Rene Saguisag (AB, Ll.B) - former Philippine Senator; Human Rights advocate; co-founder of the Movement of Attorneys for Brotherhood, Integrity, and Nationalism, Inc. (MABINI)
Augusto S. Sanchez (AB, Ll.B) - former Labor Minister during the Aquino Administration, human rights lawyer
Gen. Basilio J. Valdes (GS, HS) - former chief-of-staff of the Philippine Army

Senators and representatives
Tomas V. Apacible (CAS) - Representative, 1st District, Batangas
Alipio C. Badelles (BSC, Ll.B) - Representative, 1st district of Lanao del Norte
Amado Bagatsing (GS, HS, BS) - veteran legislator; representative of the 5th district of Manila
Leovigildo B. Banaag (AB, Ll.B) - Representative, 1st district of Agusan del Norte
Elpidio F. Barzaga (AB, Ll.B) - Representative, 4th district of Cavite
Jose Cabochan - Representative from Bulacan
Fredenil H. Castro (Ll.B) - Representative from Capiz
Neri J. Colmenares (AB) - Representative of Bayan Muna partylist
Leila de Lima (Ll.B) - Senator; former Secretary of Justice; former Chairperson, Commission on Human Rights; prominent election lawyer of Pampanga Gov. Eddie Panlilio and Isabela Gov. Grace Padaca
Arnulfo Fuentebella (GS, HS) - former Speaker of the House of Representatives; representative from Camarines Sur
Gregorio B. Honasan II (GS) - Senator and reformist military reader; one of the personalities of the first EDSA revolution
Eduardo Nonato Joson (AB, Ll.B) - Nueva Ecija representative and former National Food Authority Administrator
Roger G. Mercado (Ll.B) - Representative, lone district of Southern Leyte
Abraham Kahlil B. Mitra (GS, HS, BSC) - Palawan Congressman and son of the late Speaker Ramon Mitra
Marlyn L. Primicias-Agabas (AB, Ll.B) - Representative, 6th district of Pangasinan
Eric D. Singson (BSC) - Deputy Speaker for Luzon and representative, 1st district, Ilocos Sur
Alfonso V. Umali (GS, HS) - Representative, 2nd district, Oriental Mindoro
Rodolfo G. Valencia (GS, HS) - Representative, 2nd district, Mindoro Oriental
Reynaldo "RU" Umali (GS, HS) - Representative, 2nd district, Oriental Mindoro
Jose "Joboy" Aquino II (GS, HS) - Representative, 1st district, Agusan Del Norte

Judiciary and legal services
Roberto R. Concepcion, Sr. (GS, HS, AA) - Chief Justice of the Supreme Court of the Philippines (1966–1973); Commissioner, 1986 Philippine Constitutional Commission
Mariano C. del Castillo (AB) - Associate Justice of the Supreme Court of the Philippines
Antonio M. Martinez (Ll.B) - former Associate Justice of the Supreme Court of the Philippines
Jose Catral Mendoza (Ll.B), Associate Justice of the Supreme Court of the Philippines
Antonio Eduardo B. Nachura (Ll.B) - Associate Justice of the Supreme Court of the Philippines; former solicitor-general; former member of the House of Representatives; former faculty, San Beda College of Law; former dean, Arellano Law School
Florenz D. Regalado (Ll.B) - retired Justice of the Philippine Supreme Court; holder of the highest bar exam rating for a bar examinee
Bienvenido L. Reyes (Ll.B), Associate Justice of the Supreme Court of the Philippines
Justo P. Torres, Jr. (Ll.B) - retired Justice of the Philippine Supreme Court

Local and provincial officials
Roderick Alcala (CAS 92) - Mayor of Lucena City, Quezon
Robert Lyndon Barbers (HS) - Governor, Surigao Del Norte; former Surigao representative
Herbert Constantine M. Bautista (GS, HS, AB) - Mayor, Quezon City; former TV and movie actor
Feliciano Belmonte, Jr. (GS, HS) - Speaker of the House of Representatives and ex-mayor of Quezon City
Alfonso S. Casurra (AB, Ll.B) - Mayor, Surigao City
Calixto R. Catáquiz (HS, BS) - Mayor, San Pedro, Laguna; former General Manager of Laguna Lake Development Authority
Raphael M. Colet - former Governor of Pangasinan
Enrico "Recom" Echiverri (AB) - former representative and Former mayor of Caloocan
George A. Elias (GS, HS) - Vice Mayor, Taguig
Gerald Esplana (GS, HS) - Councilor, Valenzuela City
Tomás Eduardo Joson III (GS, HS) - former governor of Nueva Ecija
Danilo B. Lacuna (GS, HS) - former vice-mayor, City of Manila
Salvador Leachon (AB, Ll.B) - former Mayor of Calapan, Oriental Mindoro; incumbent 1st district representative and senior deputy speaker
Ferdinand Maliwanag (AB, Ll.B) - Mayor of Candelaria, Quezon
Ishmael Mathay (HS, Ll. B) - Vice-Governor of Metro Manila; former Mayor of Quezon City
Abraham Kahlil Mitra (BS Management, 91) - former Provincial Governor of Palawan
Oscar S. Moreno (AB, Ll. B) - Governor, Misamis Oriental, Congressman and former prosecutor in the impeachment trial of former President Joseph Estrada
Victor Ortega (HS) - Governor, La Union Province
Mike Rama (Ll.B) - Mayor of Cebu City
Gerardo Roxas (CAS, 83) - former Provincial Board Member of Bataan; former Mayor of Limay, Bataan
Dino Claudio M. Sanchez (CAS) - former Vice Mayor, Butuan City
Ruben Sayo (CAS, 83) - former Mayor of Aritao Town, Nueva Viscaya
Benjie Serrano (HS, 92) - Mayor Orani, Bataan
Ruben M. Umali - former Mayor, Lipa City, Batangas
Vicente Valera (CAS) - Governor, Abra
Tobit Cruz (CAS) - Councilor, Taytay, Rizal

Appointed government officials
Ricardo Abcede (Ll.B) - Commissioner, Presidential Commission on Good Government
Sanchez A. Ali (CAS) - former Ambassador to the Arab Republic of Egypt and the Sultanate of Oman
Jose E.B. Antonio - businessman and real estate pioneer; chair of the Century Properties Group, and President Gloria Macapagal - Arroyo's Special Envoy to the People's Republic of China
Zabedin M. Azis (Ll.B.) - Undersecretary, Department of Justice
Dr. Teodoro Herbosa (GS, HS) - Executive Vice President, University of the Philippines, Consultant NTF IATF COVID-19, former Undersecretary, Department of Health, former consultant Indonesia Health Ministry 
Francisco Baraan III - former senior Board Member of Pangasinan; former Justice Undersecretary 
Robert Dean Barbers (HS, BSC) - General Manager, Philippine Tourism Authority
Nicasio A. Conti (AB, Ll.B) - Commissioner, Presidential Commission on Good Government (PCGG);  faculty, San Beda Economics department
 Raoul Creencia (Ll.b) - government corporate counsel
Antonio C. Delgado - former Philippine Ambassador to the Vatican; Delivery Services and Hotel Pioneer
Gerry Espina (GS, HS) - board member, Philippine Racing Commission; former Biliran representative; Biliran Governor
Peter B. Favila (GS, HS) - Secretary of the Department of Trade and Industry, businessman
Don M. Ferry (HS) - former Vice Chairman, Development Bank of the Philippines; former chairman, Board of Transportation
Dennis Funa (HS, LLB) - Chairman, Insurance Commission
Winston F. Garcia (Ll.B) - President and General-Manager, Government Service and Insurance System (GSIS)
Lilian Hefti (Ll.B) - Commissioner and head of the Bureau of Internal Revenue (BIR)
Jose Carlitos Z. Licas (AB, Ll.B) - former OIC Deputy Commissioner, Bureau of Immigration (BI)
Jose D. Lina, Jr. (GS, HS) - former Philippine Senator, former Secretary of Interior and Local Government, former governor of Laguna
Jose Ong (AB) - former Commissioner, Bureau of Internal Revenue (BIR)
Vicente Pelagio Angala (HS) - Chief Operating Officer, Duty Free Philippines
Ricardo T. Saludo (GS, HS) - Cabinet Secretary, journalist, writer
Rene Sarmiento (AB) - Commissioner, Commission on Elections (COMELEC)

Private Law Practice
Avelino Cruz (LLB) - Founding Partner, Angara, Abello, Concepcion, Regala and Cruz (ACCRA)
Tranquil Salvador III (HS) - Partner and Co-Head, Litigation and Arbitration Department, Romulo, Mabanta, Buenaventura, Sayoc, and de los Angeles (ROMULO)

Business and economics
Manuel V. Pangilinan (GS, HS, Doctor of Humanities, honoris causa) - chairman, Philippine Long Distance Company; chief executive officer of Metro Pacific Corporation; chairman of the Board of Trustees of San Beda College-Mendiola, Manila
Vicente Cuna Jr. (GS, HS) - former President PS Bank; Board of Diectors - Metrobank

Media and entertainment
Harlon Agsaoay - founding member and lead vocals of Tanya Markova, singer and composer
Hajji Alejandro (GS, HS) - original member of The Circus Band in the early 70s, multi-awarded singer
Jimmy Antiporda (GS, HS) - composer, music arranger and record producer
Herbert Bautista - Quezon City Mayor, actor
Dingdong Dantes (AB) - actor and director
Rachelle Ann Go - singer
Eddie Gutierrez (GS, HS) - Filipino movie actor
Danny Javier (GS, HS) - member of popular and multi-awarded APO Hiking Society, singer, composer, actor and TV host
Jade Lopez - actress
Francis Magalona - rapper, actor, and businessman
Kristofer Martin-actor, singer 
Derrick Monasterio (CAS) - actor
Aga Muhlach (BSC) - actor
Niño Muhlach (BSC) - actor
Jett Pangan (GS, HS) - lead singer and founding member of The Dawn
Fernando Poe, Jr. (GS) - Filipino actor, "Da King" of Philippine movies, national artist and former 2004 Philippine presidential candidate
Jolo Revilla - actor

Medicine and health sciences
Dr. Ramon Arcadio (GS, HS, Doctor of Humanities, honoris cauca) - Chancellor, University of the Philippines-Manila
Dr. Teodoro Herbosa (GS, HS) - Executive Vice President, University of the Philippines, Consultant NTF IATF COVID-19, UP-PGH Head Emergency Medicine

Sports
Mike Advani - former PBA player; 2006-2007 Red Lions asst. coach
Edmundo "Ato" Badolato - Red Cubs legend coach; former commissioner of UAAP
Rencie Bajar (HS) - PBA player
Enrico "Koy" Banal - former head coach of the 2006 San Beda Red Lions champion team
 Rafael S. Baretto - (1956 Olympian)
Charles Borck - former Philippine Olympic basketball player (1936 Olympian)
Loreto Carbonell - 1952 Olympian
Jose Ariston Caslib - head coach, Philippines men's national football team
Tom Concon - former Junior Golf World Champion, 13–14 years old division
Roland Dantes - champion bodybuilder, martial artist and actor
Mat Ranillo III - former college basketball player of NCAA, and actor
Macky DeJoya - former PBA player, HS '83
 Antonio Genato - 1952 Olympian)
 Eduardo Lim - 1952, 1956 Olympian
Frankie Lim - former PBA player, former Red Lions Head Coach
Carlos Loyzaga - former Philippine Olympian known as the "Big Difference" to the Philippine sports press (1952, 1956 Olympian)
Joaquin "Chito" Loyzaga - Philippine basketball player and son of Carlos Loyzaga
Arturo Macapagal - former member of Philippine Olympic target shooting team
Ronald Magsanoc - Philippine basketball player
Sonny Manucat - former PBL player
Jesus Marzan - 1936 Olympian
Ato Morano - Philippine basketball player
Venancio "Benjie" Paras - Philippine basketball player; actor, HS '86
Ramon L. Pineda - member 1967-68 NCAA Junior Champions, competed 1974 Cesta-Punta Mundial, Montevideo, Uruguay; professional jai-alai player, 1975–1983
 Alberto 'Big Boy' Reynoso - 1960 Olympian, basketball
Ren-Ren Ritualo - Philippine basketball player
 Ponciano B. Saldaña - 1952 Olympian)
Melito Santos - 1952 Olympian)
LA Tenorio - Philippine basketball player
Emmanuel Boybits Victoria - former PBA player
Jose "JB" Yango - Philippine basketball player, provincial board member
Jeric Raval - former high school basketball player of NCAA, and actor
Ferdinand "Dindo" Pumaren - former PBA player, former Red Cubs

Honorary alumni
Mohammed Dzaiddin Abdullah (Doctor of Laws, honoris causa) - Malaysian Chief Justice; head, Association of Southeast Asian Nations (ASEAN) Law Association
Prof. Bienvenida Amarles-Ilago - chairperson, Social Sciences department; co-author of 1898-1992: The Philippine Presidency, with Alex Brillantes, Jr.
Corazon C. Aquino (Doctor of Humanities, honoris causa) - wife of Bedan senator Benigno Aquino Jr. and former president of the Philippines
Rev. Fr. Ranhilio C. Aquino (SJD, San Beda College, 2008, by assessment) - Vice-President for Academic Affairs, Cagayan State University; dean (on consultancy), Graduate School of Law, San Beda College; chair, Department of Jurisprudence and Legal Philosophy, Philippine Judicial Academy, Supreme Court of the Philippines; Fellow, Commonwealth Judicial Education Institution (Dalhousie University, Nova Scotia), Research Fellow, Superior Institute of Philosophy, Catholic University of Louvain (Belgium)
Isagani Cruz - former Supreme Court Justice; writer and columnist; professor, San Beda College of Law
Dr. Leopoldo J. Dejillas - social economist, author and writer; former head of the San Beda Research Development program; former faculty member of the Economics Department of the college and Arts and Sciences of San Beda College
Estelita P. Juco (Doctor of Humanities, honoris causa) - journalist and Congresswoman
Diosdado P. Macapagal - former president of the Philippines (1961–1965); lecturer and professor, San Beda College of Law
Dr. Ramon Benedicto N. Marcelino - former economic adviser to the late 2004 presidential candidate Fernando Poe, Jr.; chairperson of the Department of Economics of San Beda College
Hon. Ambeth R. Ocampo - chairman, National Historical Institute; chairman, National Commission for Culture and the Arts; former Benedictine monk and history professor at San Beda
Robert de Ocampo (Doctor of Humanities, honoris causa) - former secretary, Department of Finance; president, Asian Institute of Management
Artemio Panganiban - 21st Supreme Court Chief Justice of the Philippines; honorary alumnus, San Beda College of Law
Dr. Teresita P. Pedrajas - chairperson, World Council for Curriculum and Instruction (WCCI-UNESCO); awardee, 1999 Metrobak Most Outstanding Teacher of the Philippines
Fidel V. Ramos - former president of the Philippines; Honorary Alumnus, San Beda College of Law
Arturo Tolentino - former Philippine senator; professor, San Beda College of Law
Dr. Felina Young - first female and lay vice-president of San Beda College (2004–2007); author, writer and business expert

San Beda College Alabang

 Ryan Agoncillo (GS, HS) - TV celebrity, host and actor
 Augusto Cesare Amado Syjuco a.k.a. A.G. Syjuco (CAS) - principal music composer, producer, guitarist, bassist and synth programmer of the first nominee and winner from the Philippines in the international Independent Music Awards; internationally released and acclaimed art band Jack of None
 Rico Blanco (GS, HS) - former vocalist of Rivermaya
 Bernard Cardona - actor and host
 Lino Cayetano (GS, HS) - Taguig City Mayor, television director and brother of Senator Pia S. Cayetano
 Enrique Gil (CAS) - actor, dancer, matinee idol, host
 Marlo Mortel (CAS) - model, singer, and actor
 Redmond F. Domingo aka Cogie Domingo - actor, model, endorser

References

San Beda
San Beda College